The Glyph Comics Awards are annual awards created specifically for comic creators who are people of color to inspire young writers from diverse backgrounds to participate in the comic industry. 

The awards are named for the blog Glyphs: The Language of the Black Comics Community, at Pop Culture Shock. It was founded in 2005 by comic journalist Rich Watson as "a means to provide news and commentary of comics with black themes, as well as tangential topics in the fields of black science-fiction/fantasy and animation."

The Glyph Comics Awards have been presented at the East Coast Black Age of Comics Convention, in Philadelphia, since 2006.

Judges

2006 
Source: 
 Omar Bilal, creator of the Museum of Black Superheroes website
 Guy LeCharles Gonzalez, senior comics editor at Pop Culture Shock
 Stephanie Brandford, moderator of the Dwayne McDuffie forum at VHive
 Eliot Johnson, co-founder of the fan club STEEL (Stop Trying to Eliminate Ethnic Legends) and former columnist with Broken Frontier
 Rich Watson, Glyph Comics Awards founder

2007 
 Johanna Draper Carlson, founder of the review website ComicsWorthReading.com
 Pam Noles, professional writer and former Eisner Awards judge
 Calvin Reid, senior editor for Publishers Weekly and former Eisner Awards judge
 Hannibal Tabu, online comics reviewer and professional fiction writer
 Rich Watson, Glyph awards founder

2008 
 Cheryl Lynn Eaton, comics journalist and founder of the Ormes Society
 Prof. William Foster, comics historian and lecturer
 Tony Isabella, comics writer and columnist
 Katherine Keller, editor-in-chief, Sequential Tart
 Rich Watson, Glyph awards founder

2009 
 Valerie D'Orazio, president of the Friends of Lulu
 Nathan Erhardt, writer, Comics Nexus
 Ed Mathews, columnist, Pop Image
 Tim O'Shea, writer/interviewer, TalkingWithTim.com
 Elayne Riggs, comics reviewer and commentator

2010 
 David Brothers, comics blogger (4th Letter!)
 Carol Burrell, editorial director, Graphic Universe/Lerner Publishing Group
 Brian Cronin, writer, Comic Book Resources
 Katie & Dan Merritt, co-owners, Green Brain Comics

2011 
 Jennifer Contino, comics journalist
 Martha Cornog, graphic novel columnist for Library Journal
 Joseph Phillip Illidge, writer, Expo Weekly
 J. Calendar Mozzocco, writer for Newsarama
 Chad Nevett, writer for Comics Should Be Good

2012 
 Omar Bilal, webmaster, BlackSuperhero.com
 Robin Brenner, editor-in-chief, NoFlyingNoTights.com
 David Brothers, comics blogger, 4thLetter.com
 Tim Callahan, comics blogger, Comic Book Resources

2013 
Source: 
 Maurice Waters, owner and operator of Blackscifi.com
 Hannibal Tabu, review columnist at Comic Book Resources
 Omar Bilal, Owner and Operator of Museum of Black Superheroes
 Eric Deggans, TV and media critic, Tampa Bay Times

2014 
Source: 
 Pamela Thomas, Glyph Comics Awards Chairperson and curator of the Museum of UnCut Funk, a virtual museum that celebrates 1970s Black culture
 Omar Bilal, founder of the Museum of Black Superheroes
 Johanna Draper Carlson, founder of ComicsWorthReading.com
 Hannibal Tabu, author, comics reviewer, and editor-in-chief of Komplicated at The Good Men Project
 Maurice Waters, owner of Black-Scifi.com
 Joseph Wheeler III, president of the New Art Order, founder of the OnyxCon convention, and creator of the UAC ANKh Project

2016 
Source: 
 Pamela Thomas, Glyph Comics Awards chair
 Michael A. Gonzales, author, writer, blogger
 Regina L. Sawyer, owner of Lockett Down Publications
 Grace D. Gipson, doctoral student, University of California, Berkeley
 Jiba Molei Anderson, CEO of Griot Enterprises
 Mark A. Randolph, writer, educator, and collector

2020 
 Shenkarr Davis, Glyph Comics Award chair
 Crystal Sparrow, freelance writer
 Carla Wiley, co-founder of Progeny's Legacy Jamaa
 William Mason Jones, founder of Afrofuturism Network
 Deirdre Hollman, founder of the Black Comics Collective
 Tatiana Bacchus, videographer/filmmaker

List of Glyph Comics Awards winners

Pioneer Award 
 2004: Samuel Joyner, cartoonist
 2005: Bertram Fitzgerald, editor and publisher, Golden Legacy Comics
 2006: Turtel Onli, creative artist and educator
 2007: Larry Fuller, underground comics artist and publisher

Story of the Year 
 2006: Nat Turner, Kyle Baker, writer and artist
 2007:  Stagger Lee, Derek McCulloch, writer, Shepherd Hendrix, artist
 2008: Sentences: The Life of MF Grimm, Percy Carey, writer, Ronald Wimberly, artist
 2009: Bayou, Jeremy Love, writer and artist
 2010: Unknown Soldier #13-14, Joshua Dysart, writer, Pat Masioni, artist
 2011: Fist, Stick, Knife, Gun, Geoffrey Canada, writer, Jamar Nicholas, artist
 2012: Princeless, Jeremy Whitley, writer, M. Goodwin, artist
 2013: Monsters 101, Muhammad Rasheed, writer/artist
 2014: Watson and Holmes #6, Brandon Easton (writer) and N. Steven Harris (artist)
 2015: Shaft, David F. Walker (writer) and Bilquis Evely (artist)
 2016: Revelation: Brotherman-Dictator of Discipline, Dawud Anyabwile (artist), Guy A. Sims (writer), and Brian McGee (colorist)
 2017: March Book Three, John Lewis and Andrew Aydin (writers) and Nate Powell (artist)
 2018: Matty's Rocket: Book One, Tim Fielder (writer/artist)
 2019: Is'Nana the Were-Spider, Vol 2: The Hornet’s Web, Greg Anderson Elysee (writer) and Daryl Toh (artist)
 2020: Malika — Fallen Queen Part One, Roye Okupe (writer); Sunkanmi Akinboye and Etubi Onucheyo (artists)

Best Writer 
 2006:  Lance Tooks, Lucifer's Garden of Verses: Darlin' Niki
 2007:  Derek McCulloch, Stagger Lee
 2008:  James Sturm, Satchel Paige: Striking Out Jim Crow
 2009:  Jeremy Love, Bayou
 2010: Alex Simmons, Archie & Friends
 2011: Joshua Dysart, Unknown Soldier
 2012: Jeremy Whitley, Princeless
 2013: Brandon M. Easton, Shadowlaw
 2014: Brandon M. Easton, Watson and Holmes #6
 2015: Keef Cross, Day Black
 2016: Juliana "Jewels" Smith, (H)Afrocentric
 2017: John Lewis & Andrew Aydin, March Book Three
 2018: Jamar Nicholas, Leon: Protector of the Playground
 2019: Greg Anderson Elysee, Is 'Nana the Were-Spider, Vol 2: The Hornet’s Web
 2020: Newton Lilavois, Crescent City Monsters

Best Artist 
 2006: Kyle Baker, Nat Turner
 2007: Kyle Baker, The Bakers
 2008: Kyle Baker, Nat Turner: Revolution
 2009: Jeremy Love, Bayou
 2010: Jay Potts, World of Hurt
 2011: Richard Koslowski, BB Wolf and the 3 LPs
 2012: Sara Pichelli, Ultimate Comics: Spider-Man
 2013: Chris Samnee, Ultimate Comics: Spider-Man #6
 2014: N. Steven Harris, Watson and Holmes #6
 2015: Nelson Blake 2, Artifacts
 2016: Dawud Anyabwile, Brotherman: Dictator of Discipline: Revelation Book One
 2017: Brian Stelfreeze, Black Panther
 2018: Shauna J. Grant, Princess Love Pon
 2019: Khary Randolph, Roger Robinson, and Manuel Garcia, Noble, Vol 2: Never Events
 2020: Gian Carlo Bernal, Crescent City Monsters

Best Male Character 
 2006: Huey Freeman, The Boondocks; Aaron McGruder, writer/artist
 2007: Stagger Lee, Stagger Lee; Derek McCulloch, writer, Shepherd Hendrix, artist; inspired by the life of Lee Shelton
 2008: Emmet Wilson, Satchel Paige: Striking Out Jim Crow; co-created by James Sturm, writer, and Rich Tommaso, artist
 2009: Black Lightning, Final Crisis: Submit; Grant Morrison, writer, Matthew Clark, Norm Rapmund, Rob Hunter, and Don Ho, artists
 2010: Isaiah Pastor, World of Hurt; created by Jay Potts, writer and artist
 2011: Geoff, Fist, Stick, Knife, Gun; created by Geoffrey Canada, writer, and Jamar Nicholas, artist
 2012: Miles Morales; Ultimate Comics: Spider-Man; Brian Michael Bendis, writer, Sara Pichelli, artist; inspired by the character created by Stan Lee & Steve Ditko
 2013: Mort; Monsters 101; Muhammad Rasheed, writer/artist
 2014: Jack Maguire; Nowhere Man: You Don't Know Jack; Jerome Walford, writer/artist
 2015: Bass Reeves; Bass Reeves: Tales of the Talented Tenth; Joel Christian Gill, writer/artist
 2016: Arron Day (Blackjack); BlackJack: There Came a Dark Hunter; Alex Simmons, writer; Tim Fielder, artist
 2017: Matt Trakker; M.A.S.K. — Mobile Armored Strike Kommand; Brandon Easton, writer; Tony Vargas & Tommy Lee Edwards, artists
 2018: Is 'nana the Were-Spider; Is 'nana the Were-Spider: The Hornet's Web #1, Greg Anderson-Elysee, writer/artist
 2019: Noble; Noble, Vol 2: Never Events, Brandon Thomas (writer), Khary Randolph, Roger Robinson, and Manuel Garcia (artists)
 2020: Is'nana the Were-Spider; Is 'nana the Were-Spider: The Ballads of Rawhead and John Henry, Greg Anderson Elysee (writer) and David Brame & Walter Ostlie (artists)

Best Female Character 
 2006: Darlin' Niki, Lucifer's Garden of Verses: Darlin' Niki
 2007: Thomasina Lindo, Welcome to Tranquility; co-created by Gail Simone, writer, Neil Googe, artist
 2008: Amanda Waller, Checkmate; Greg Rucka, writer, Joe Bennett & Jack Jadson, artists
 2009: Lee Wagstaff, Bayou,, Jeremy Love, writer and artist
 2010: Aya, Aya: The Secrets Come Out, created by Marguerite Abouet, writer, Clement Oubrerie, artist
 2011: Selena, 28 Days Later, created by Michael Alan Nelson, writer, Declan Shalvey and Marek Oleksicki, artists
 2012: Adrienne; Princeless; created by Jeremy Whitley, writer, and M. Goodwin, artist
 2013: Dyana; Night Stalker; Orlando Harding, writer; David Miller, artist
 2014: Ajala Storm; Ajala: A Series of Adventures; Robert Garrett (writer) and N. Steven Harris (artist)
 2015: Ajala Storm; Ajala: A Series of Adventures; Robert Garrett (writer) and N. Steven Harris & Walt Msonza Barna, (artists)
 2016: Moon Girl; Moon Girl and Devil Dinosaur; Brandon Montclare and Amy Reeder (writers) and Natacha Bustos and Amy Reeder (artists)
 2017: Lily Brown; Malice in Ovenland vol. #1; Micheline Hess, writer/artist
 2018: Matty Watty; Matty's Rocket: Book One Tim Fielder (writer/artist)
 2019: Blackstarr; Blackstarr: Birth of a Supernova Part 1, by Charlene R. Jones (writer) and Corey Thomas (artist)
 2020: Iyanu; Iyanu, Child of Wonder Chapter One, by Roye Okupe (writer) and Godwin Akpan (artist)

Rising Star Award 
 2006: Robert Roach, The Roach
 2007: Spike Trotman, Templar, Arizona
 2008: Marguerite Abouet, Aya
 2009: Damian Duffy and John Jennings, The Hole: Consumer Culture
 2010: Jay Potts, World of Hurt
 2011: Jamar Nicholas, Fist, Stick, Knife, Gun
 2012: Whit Taylor, Watermelon
 2013: Raymond Ayala, writer, H.O.P.E.
 2014: Alverne Ball (writer), Jason Reeves and Luis Guerrero (artists), One Nation #1
 2015: Alverne Ball & Jason Reeves (writers), Lee Moyer and Ari Syahrazad (artists), One Nation: Old Druids
 2016: Chuck Collins (writer and artist), Bounce!
 2017: Marcus Williams	and Greg Burnham, Tuskegee Heirs: Flames of Destiny
 2018: Greg Anderson-Elysee, (writer and artist), Is'Nana the Were-Spider: The Hornet's Web #1
 2019: Austine Osas (writer) and Yusuf Shittuh (artist), Under the Sun
 2020: Allison Chaney Whitmore (writer) and Carola Borelli (artist), Love University

Best Reprint Publication
 2006:  Birth of a Nation: a Comic Novel softcover, Crown
 2007: Deogratias: A Tale of Rwanda, First Second Books; Mark Siegel, editor, Alexis Siegel, translator
 2008: Aya, Drawn & Quarterly; Chris Oliveros, publisher, Helge Dascher, translator
 2009: Me and the Devil Blues V1, Del Rey Manga; David Ury, translator/adapter
 2010: Aya: The Secrets Come Out, Drawn & Quarterly
 2011: Superman vs. Muhammad Ali Deluxe Hardcover, DC Comics
 2012: No award given
 2013: No award given
 2014: Martin Luther King and the Montgomery Story, Fellowship of Reconciliation/Top Shelf Productions
 2015: Techwatch, Chameleon Creations
 2016: Concrete Park vol. 2: R-E-S-P-E-C-T, Dark Horse Comics
 2017: E.X.O.: The Legend of Wale Williams, Part One, YouNeek Studios
 2018: Moon Girl and Devil Dinosaur vol. 3: Smartest There Is, Marvel Comics
 2019: Malika – Warrior Queen Part One, YouNeek Studios
 2020: Blackstarr: Birth of a Supernova Part One, Shugalene Publications

Best Cover 
 2006: Nat Turner #1, Kyle Baker, illustrator
 2007: Stagger Lee, Shepherd Hendrix, artist
 2008: Sentences: The Life of MF Grimm; Ronald Wimberly, illustrator
 2009: Unknown Soldier #1; Igor Kordey, illustrator
 2010: Luke Cage Noir #1; Tim Bradstreet, illustrator
 2011: Unknown Soldier #5; Dave Johnson, illustrator
 2012: Chew #27; Rob Guillory, illustrator
 2013: Indigo Hit List 1.0; Charlie Goubile and Mshindo Kuumba I, artists
 2014: Route 3 #2: A Date... A Destiny; Sean Hill, artist
 2015: Offset #1: "The Man Who Travels with a Piece of Sugarcane": Tristan Roach, artist
 2016: Blue Hand Mojo: Dust to Dust, John Jennings, artist
 2017: Black #1, Khary Randolph, artist
 2018: Matty's Rocket: Book One, Tim Fielder, artist
 2019: Noble, Vol 2: Never Events, Khary Randolph, artist
 2020: Crescent City Monsters #2, Gian Carlo Bernal, artist

Best Comic Strip or Webcomic 
 2006: The K Chronicles, Keith Knight, writer/artist
 2007:  The K Chronicles, Keith Knight, writer/artist
 2008: The K Chronicles, Keith Knight, writer/artist
 2009: Bayou, Jeremy Love, writer/artist
 2010: The K Chronicles, Keith Knight, writer/artist
 2011: The K Chronicles, Keith Knight, writer/artist
 2012: Fungus Grotto, Shatia Hamilton, writer
 2013: Mama's Boyz, Jerry Craft, writer/artist
 2014: The Adigun Ogunsanwo, Carles C. J. Juzang, writer/artist
 2015: Kamikaze; Alan and Carrie Tupper (writers and artists); Havana Nguyen (artist)
 2016: Bounce!; Chuck Collins, writer/artist
 2017: Tuskegee Heirs: Flames of Destiny; Marcus Williams (writer) and Greg Burnham (artist)
 2018: (H)afrocentric vols. 1–4; Juliana "Jewels" Smith (writer); Ronald Nelson (artist)
 2019: Weapon of the People: Decoded; Muhammad Rasheed (writer/artist)
 2020: Isshoni, by Alfred Stewart (writer/artist)

Fan Award for Best Comic / Best Work 
 2006: Black Panther: Who is the Black Panther?, Reginald Hudlin, John Romita, Jr., Klaus Janson, Axel Alonso
 2007: Storm, Eric Jerome Dickey, David Yardin & Lan Medina and Jay Leisten & Sean Parsons
 2008: Fantastic Four: The New Fantastic Four; Dwayne McDuffie, writer, Paul Pelletier & Rick Magyar, artists
 2009:  Vixen: Return of the Lion; G. Willow Wilson, writer, Cafu, artist
 2010: Luke Cage Noir; Mike Benson and Adam Glass, writers, Shawn Martinbrough, artist
 2011: Captain America/Black Panther: Flags of our Fathers; Reginald Hudlin, writer, Denys Cowan, artist
 2013: Ascended: The Omega Nexus, Roger Reece and Jerry Reece (writers)
 2014: Watson and Holmes #6, Brandon Easton (writer) and N. Steven Harris (artist)
 2015: OneNation: SafeHouse, Jason Reeves (writer), Samax Amen & Deon De Lange (artists)
 2016: Bounce!; Chuck Collins, writer/artist
 2017: M.A.S.K.: Mobile Armored Strike Kommand, Brandon Easton (writer) and Tony Vargas (artist)
 2018: Is 'Nana the Were Spider: The Hornet's Web #1, Greg Anderson-Elysee (writer/artist)
 2019: Endigo Society: The Golden Age, Norwick Robinson (writer), Mikhail Sebastian & Brandon Treadway
 2020: Crescent City Monsters, Newton Lilavois (writer) and Gian Carlo Bernal (artist)

References

External links 

 Glyph_Comics_Awards on Facebook
 
 
 Publishers Weekly coverage of 2007 Glyph Comics Awards

Comics awards
American comics creators
Awards honoring African Americans
African-American comics